Vasili Yuryevich Chernitsyn (born 15 May 1977) is a retired Russian professional footballer. He made his debut in the Russian Premier League in 1999 for FC Shinnik Yaroslavl.

References

1977 births
Living people
Russian footballers
FC Shinnik Yaroslavl players
Russian Premier League players
FC Nizhny Novgorod (2007) players
FC Vityaz Podolsk players
Association football goalkeepers
FC Dynamo Vologda players
FC Lukhovitsy players
FC Sheksna Cherepovets players